Prudy is the name of several rural localities in Russia:
Prudy, Leningrad Oblast, a settlement in Leningrad Oblast
Prudy, Vladimir Oblast, a village in Vladimir Oblast
Prudy, name of several other rural localities